Erythroblastopenia (a decrease of red blood cells in a complete blood count) may refer to:
 Acquired pure red cell aplasia
 Transient erythroblastopenia of childhood

See also
 Polycythemia
 Anemia